The 1997 Junior World Sports Acrobatics Championships was the fifth edition of the acrobatic gymnastics competition, then named sports acrobatics, and took place in Honolulu, Hawaii, United States, from May 29 to 31, 1997. The competition was organized by the International Federation of Sports Acrobatics (IFSA).

Medal summary

Results

References

Junior World Acrobatic Gymnastics Championships
Junior World Acrobatic Gymnastics Championships
International gymnastics competitions hosted by the United States
Junior World Gymnastics Championships